The genus Hypericum contains approximately 500 species which are divided into 36 sections as described by botanist Norman Robson. This division into distinct sections is largely due to the fact that a genus-wide monograph was performed by Robson in 1977, which allowed for a comprehensive analysis of the genus's taxonomy. A phylogenetic study was more recently completed for the genus, which gave evidence to suggest that the genus Triadenum is a clade within Hypericum and that the genus Thornea is sister to Hypericum. In addition, the study found that about 60% of the sections of Hypericum are monophyletic.

Almost all species of Hypericum are either perennial herbs, shrubs, or small trees, but the genus also contains a small amount of subshrubs and annual herbs. Most of its species contain hypericin or hyperforin and some are used for their healing properties in folk medicine. The species' leaves are always placed opposite, and are normally decussate. Their flowers are generally homostylous, but very few are dimorphically heterostylous. The petals are normally golden yellow or orange, but some are white or cream, and are veined dorsally. They have 4-5 stamen fascicles, 2-5 ovaries, and 2-5 styles. Some species grow capsular fruit which are colored red or blackish.

Hypericum species can be found all over the world in temperate to tropical areas. The genus is most diverse in Turkey (~80 species) and China (~60 species), but can be found across Asia and Europe, in parts of Africa and South America, Australia, and across the United States and Southern Canada. Non-native species have also been introduced into various regions of the United States and Argentina. The genus are generally found in dry, desert areas to being in shallow water, and can be found from warm temperate climates to cold temperate climates.

Some Hypericum species are used as ornamental plants because of their large, spreading flowers. These include H. aegypticum, H. androsaemum, H. calycinum, and H. olympicum. In addition, there are a number of hybrids and cultivars that have been developed for use in horticulture. Some notable cultivars are H. × moserianum, H. 'Hidcote', and H. 'Rowallane'. Several species are also used for their medicinal properties, especially their ability to alleviate mild clinical depression, by drawing out the oily extract from the flowers. H. perforatum is the most potent out of all the species, and is the only species cultivated commercially for herbalism and medicine. 

Legend

Sect. Adenosepalum
Adenosepalum Spach is divided into four subsections: Adenosepalum, Aethiopica, Caprifolia, and the Huber-Morathii Group. These subsections contain eight, seven, eleven, and five species, respectively, giving the section Adenosepalum a total of thirty-one species. In addition, Adenosepalum contains two Nothospecies: H. × joerstadii and H. pubescens × tomentosum. H. annulatum has three distinct subspecies.

Adenosepalum is made up of primarily perennial herbs, and also includes shrubs and shrublets. Its species grow to be approximately 2.5 meters tall, and are generally deciduous. Species in Adenosepalum are glabrous or have simple hairs, and almost always have dark black glands on their leaves, sepals, and rarely on their petals and stems. Their leaves are placed opposite and have no ventral glands. Their flowers are stellate or homostylous. They have 5 sepals, 5 stamen fascicles, and 5 petals.

Sect. Adenotrias
Adenotrias (Jaub. & Spach) R. Keller contains three species: H. aciferum, H. aegypticum, and H. russeggeri. Its type species is H. russeggeri. It is not divided into any subsections. H. aegypticum has three subspecies: H. aegypticum aegypticum L., H. aegypticum maroccanum (Pau) N.Robson, and H. aegypticum webbii (Spach) N.Robson.

Adenotrias contains shrubs and shrublets. Its species can grow to be up to 2 meters tall. Its species are glabrous, but have no dark glands. Their leaves are lined and glandular, and are cortex green. Their flowers are almost tubular, and are heterostylous. They have 5 sepals, 5 petals, and 3 stamen fascicles.

Sect. Androsaemum 
Androsaemum (Duhamel) Godron contains four species: H. androsaemum, H. foliosum, H. grandifolium, and H. hircinum. In addition, Androsaemum contains one Nothospecies: H. × inodorum. It is not divided into subsections. Its type species is H. androsaemum. One of its species, H. grandifolium, has five different subspecies. The section's species are often collectively referred to as Tutsan.

Androsaemum contains shrubs that grow to be from 0.3–2 meters tall. Its species are deciduous and glabrous, but have no dark glands. Their leaves are opposite, decussate, free, and are a pale color. Every species has 20 flowers, branching out from 2 separate nodes, which are homostylous. They have 5 sepals, 5 petals, and 5 stamen fascicles.

Sect. Arthrophyllum
Arthrophyllum Jaub. & Spach contains five species, and is not divided into any subsections. Its type species is H. rupestre. Arthrophyllum is most closely related to Webbia.

Arthrophyllum contains shrubs that grow to be approximately 0.9 meters tall and are deciduous but never leafless. Species in Arthrophyllum are glabrous, with reddish to dark glands. Their leaves are placed opposite and are either decussate, sessile, free, or perfoliate and have no ventral glands. They are 40-flowered, and their flowers are stellate and homostylous. They have 5 sepals that lack marginal glands. Arthrophyllum's species also have 5 petals and 3 stamen fascicles, each with 20-40 stamens. Their seeds are narrow and cylindrical.

Sect. Ascyreia 
Ascyreia Choisy contains exactly 50 species and also includes four nothospecies. The section is one of the largest in the genus that is not divided into any subsections. Its type species is H. calycinum. The section is synonymous with Norysca Spach..

Ascyreia is made up of mostly shrubs or shrublets, but also contains a few trees. Its species generally grow to be from 4–5 meters tall. Some of the species are evergreen, but most are deciduous. They are glabrous, and lack dark glands. Their leaves are opposite, decussate, and free. The section's species have anywhere from 1-25 flowers, which are stellate and homostylous. They have five sepals, which are free. They also have five petals and five stamen fascicles, which each have 20-100 stamens. Their seeds are cylindric or ellipsoid, and some are laterally winged.

Sect. Brathys
Brathys (Mutis ex L.f.) Choisy is the largest section in Hypericum. It is divided into four subsections: Brathys, Phellotes, Spachium, and Styphelioides. Brathys contains 38 species and the type species, H. juniperinum. Phellotes contains 32 species, Spachium contains 14 species, and Styphelioides contains just 2 species. In total, the section contains 86 species.

Brathys contains a wide variety of plants, including small trees, shrubs, shrublets, and herbs. The largest species in the section grow to be 6 meters tall, and are evergreen. Its species are glabrous—though a few have simple hairs—and lack any dark glands. Their stems are either 4 or 6-lined, and are compressed when the plant is young, but later become terete. Their leaves are placed opposite, are decussate and sessile, and have dense marginal glands. All the species have either one flower on the uppermost node of the plant or 2-15 flowers branching from the uppermost node and from lower secondary nodes. The flowers are stellate or sometimes obconic, and are homostylous. The species have 5 petals which are persistent. They have 5 stamen fascicles which contain anywhere from 1-50 stamens each, formed in a tight ring, to give the plants a total of anywhere from 5-250 stamens. The plants have 5 ovaries, 5 sepals, and 3-5 styles.

Sect. Bupleuroides 
Bupleuroides Stef. contains one species, H. bupleuroides, which shares the name of the section.

H. bupleuroides is a perennial herb that grows to be approximately 75 centimeters tall. The species' stems sprout from branching rhizomes, and are glabrous and lack dark glands. The leaves are placed opposite and are terete and are perfoliate. It has anywhere from 4-25 flowers that branch from 1-5 nodes and are stellate and homostylous and have 5 petals. There are either 3 or 4 stamen fascicles with 20-25 stamens each. The species has 5 sepals, 3 ovaries, and 3 styles.

Sect. Campylopus
Campylopus Boiss. contains one species, H. cerastioides, which is also frequently called H. campylopus. This species is widely cultivated for its vibrant flowers. The section is most closely related to Olympia and Oligostema which are its sister taxa.

Hypericum cerastioides is a perennial herb that grows to be 6-25 centimeters tall, and normally grows upright but sometimes grows prostrate along the ground. It can have a few or numerous stems from plant to plant, and is normally unbranched or branched only below the inflorescence. The stems are white and pubescent with 5-35 millimeter long internodes that can be either shorter or longer than the leaves. It is 1-5 flowered with flowers 2-5 centimeters in diameter. The petals are golden yellow without a tint of red and number 2 times the number of sepals in the inflorescence, and there are 60-100 stamens.

Sect. Camplyosporus 
Campylosporus (Spach) R. Keller contains ten species from Africa and the Middle East. Its type species is H. lanceolatum.

The section contains primarily shrubs and trees that can be spreading or grow up to twelve meters tall. They are all evergreen and may or may not have dark glands along the branches. Most species have bark which is fissured and scaly. The species have many flowers which are homostylous. They have five sepals, five petals, and five stamen fascicles which each have 20-45 stamens.

Sect. Concinna 
Concinna N.Robson contains one species, H. concinnum, which is commonly known as Goldwire.

H. concinnum is a perennial herb or infrequently a subshrub that grows up to 45 centimeters tall.  Its stems are erect or ascend from taproots and have dark glands, and change from 4-lined to 2-lined as the species grows. The leaves are placed opposite, and are decussate and free, with closed lamina. The species is 17-flowered and the flowers are stellate and homostylous, with five petals each. The species has five stamen fascicles and a total of 40-100 stamens.

Sect. Coridium 
Coridium Spach contains six species from with distributions across Europe. Its type species is H. coris.

The species in the section are low dwarf shrubs or perennial herbs that grow up to 60 centimeters tall. The leaves are glabrous or paperlike, with stems that branch from the taproot and that have dark red and black glands. The leaves are three or four-whorled and have one vein. The species have one to many flowers that come from one to six nodes and are stellate and homostylous. They have five sepals, five petals, and three stamen fascicles with a total of 25-60 stamens.

Sect. Crossophyllum 
Crossophyllum Spach contains 4 species of perennial herbs. Its type species is H. orientale. The other species in the section are H. adenotrichum, H. aucheri, and H. thasium.

Species in Crossophyllum grow to be around 55 centimeters tall. They are glabrous, and their stems are erect from a rooting base. Their flowers also branch from the base and sometimes from intermediate nodes. The species have anywhere from 1 to 50 flowers which are stellate and homostylous. Their stems are narrow and eglandular and have dark black or amber glands on raised lines. The leaves are placed opposite and are free and decussate. The species have 5 sepals, 5 petals, and 3 or 5 stamen fascicles with 10-20 stamens each.

Sect. Drosocarpium 
Drosocarpium Spach contains small perennial herbs that are found around the Mediterranean. H. richeri has 3 subspecies.

The species in the section grow up to 80 centimeters tall and are glabrous (except H. rochelii). Their leaves are placed opposite and are decussate and free. The species have anywhere between one and seventy flowers branching from one to three nodes which are stellate and homostylous. The species has five petals that are persistent after flowering and erect but not twisting, three or four stamen fascicles with a total of thirty to eighty stamens, and three to four styles.

Sect. Elodeoida
Elodeoida N.Robson contains tall species of annual and perennial herbs. Its type species is H. elodeoides.

The species in the section grow to be up to one meter tall. Their stems are erect or lie flat, sometimes branch out at the base, and are terete. The leaves have dark glands on them and are placed opposite, are decussate, and grow about a centimeter long. The species can have up to fifty flowers, which are homostylous and stellate. They have five petal that remain after flowering and are erect. There are five stamen fascicles are there are a total of nine to sixty stamens with dark anther glands. The seeds are cylindric.

Sect. Graveolentia 
Graveolentia N.Robson is a diverse section of nine species whose type species is H. graveolens.

Graveolentia is similar to sect. Hypericum but differs in having mature stem internodes with different characteristics, as well as sepals with linear laminar glands and amber anther glands. Species in the section have one to seventy flowers regularly, but can have up to 124 in some circumstances, and they grow from one to four different nodes. The species have five sepals that are free and persistent and stand erect when the plants are in fruit. They also have five petals that are erect and not twisting and lack apiculus. There are also five stamen fascicles with a total of sixteen to ninety stamens.

Sect. Heterophylla
Heterophylla N.Robson contains a single shrublet, H. heterophyllum, from which the section derives its name.

H. heterophyllum is a shrublet that grows to be up to 25 centimeters tall. It is semi-deciduous and glabrous and lacks dark glands. The stems are 2-lined and are colored cortex green, but their bark is smooth and reddish brown. The leaves are placed opposite and are decussate, sessile, and free. The leaf blades are open or 1-nerved and their glands are linear to punctiform and are dense in the margins but the ventral glands are absent. They have 3-12 flowers that branch from 1-3 nodes and sometimes the lower branches will flower as well., and the flowers are stellate and homostylous. There are five sepals, three styles, and three stamen fascicles with a total of 35-45 stamens.

Sect. Hirtella 
Hirtella Stef., not to be confused with the unrelated genus Hirtella described by Linnaeus, is split into two subsections: subsect. Platyadenum and subsect. Stenadum, which have eighteen and eleven species respectively for a total of twenty nine species.

The section contains perennial herbs that grow up to eighty centimeters tall. They are often glaucous and the stems are erect or decumbent, and are rarely rooting (H. hyssopifolium).  The stems are 2-lined and usually glandiferous. The leaves are placed opposite, are decussate, sessile, and are usually free. The leaf blades have pale glands but lack ventral glands. The species have few to many flowers that grow from five to fifteen nodes, and sometimes have flowering branches from lower nodes. Their flowers are stellate and homostylous. They have five sepals, five petals that are sometimes tinged red, and around three stamen fascicles with a total of 25-60 stamens. The seeds are cylindrical in shape.

Sect. Humifusoideum 
Humifusoideum R. Keller, also called Pulogensia, contains 6 species. Its type species is H. peplidifolium. H. beccarii has two subspecies: H. beccarii beccarii and H. beccarii steenisii.

Sect. Humifusoideum contains shrubs, subshrubs, and herbs that grow erect or prostrate and grow up to 1.5 meters tall. The shrubs are evergreen and glabrous and usually have dark glands. The stems are either 2-lined or 4-lined and are flattened when the plant is young, they usually lack glands, but rarely have dark glands; they are colored cortex greed or a dark red, while the bark is smooth and colored red-brown. The leaves are placed opposite, are decussate and free, and their blades are entire and either closed or open, with pale glands. The species usually have one flower, but very rarely can have up to ten that come from two nodes. The flowers are stellate and homostylous and have five free sepals that are persistent, five petals that are persistent and spreading, and three to five stamen fascicles with anywhere from ten to eighty stamens. The seeds are cylindric.

Sect. Hypericum 
Hypericum, sometimes referred to as the "type section" of the genus, contains perennial herbs and very few subshrubs. It contains the type species of the genus, H. perforatum. Subsect. Erecta, with twenty-three species, is the far less studied subsection of the section, while the details of subsect. Hypericum have been much more analyzed. Subsect. Hypericum has eighteen species total, with ten (including the type species) in ser. Hypericum, and eight in ser. Senanensia. The section contains forty-one species in total.

The species in sect. Hypericum grow to be 1.2 meters tall and can grow either erect or prostrate. They are glabrous some have dark glands while others do not. Their stems are 2-lined or 2-winged when young and either remain so or become terete as the plant ages. The leaves are placed opposite or abnormally whorled, are decussate, and are either sessile or pseudopetiolate, as well as being free and persistent. They are up to 70-flowered from one to four nodes, with some lower subsidiary branches. The flowers are stellate and homostylous. The species have 5 persistent sepals, 3 stamen fascicles, and 20-100 total stamens.

Sect. Inodora 
Inodora Stef. contains one species, a shrub called H. xylosteifolium or sometimes H. inodorum.

H. xylosteifolium grows to be approximately 1.5 meters, and is a deciduous plant. It typically has anywhere from 1-7 flowers, which are terminal and sometimes have subsidiary branches. The flowers are 1.5–3 cm in diameter and are stellate and rounded. Its anthers are yellow-orange and its stamen are in fascicles in groups of 10-11.

Sect. Monanthema 
Monanthema N.Robson contains 7 species native to eastern Asia. One of its species, H. monanthemum, has two subspecies: H. monanthemum filicaule and H. monanthemum monanthemum.

The section contains small perennial herbs that grow up to 40 centimeters tall. Their stems are erect to prostrate, and are creeping and branching at the base of the plant. They are glabrous and have dark glands on their leaves, seals, and petals. The stems are terete when mature and are normally eglandular, but will very rarely have a few reddish glands. The leaves are opposite, decussate, and sessile or pseudopetiolate. The laminar glands are either pale or black, and can be very dense to almost absent, and are relatively small. The species are normally 1-15 flowered, but in rare cases can have up to 50 flowers. They grow from one or two nodes, with lower subsidiary branches, and are stellate and homostylous. They have five sepals, five petals, five stamen fascicles with 10-45 total stamens, and 2-4 ovaries. The seeds are cylindric and not carinate.

Sect. Myriandra 
Myriandra (Spach) R. Keller contains shrubs, shrublets, and perennial herbs that grow to be up to 4.5 m.

Sect. Oligostema 
Oligostema (Boiss.) Stef. consists of perennial and annual herbs up to 75 cm tall.

Sect. Olympia
Olympia (Spach) Nymam contains four dwarf shrubs. Its type species is H. olympicum.

Sect. Origanifolia 
Origanifolia Spach contains 13 species of shrub-like perennial herbs. Its type species is H. origanifolium.

Sect. Psorophytum 
Psorophytum (Spach) Nyman contains a single species, H. balearicum.

Sect. Roscyna 
Roscyna (Spach) R. Keller contains 2 species: its type species, H. ascyron, and H. przewalskii. Roscyna was once considered to be its own individual genus which contained only the two species. H. ascyron has two subspecies, H. ascyron ascyron and H. ascyron gebleri.

Sect. Sampsonia 
Sampsonia N.Robson contains two species: its type species, H. sampsonii, and H. assamicum.

Sect. Santomasia 
Santomasia (N.Robson) N.Robson contains a single species, H. steyermarkii.

Sect. Taeniocarpium 
Taeniocarpium Jaub. & Spach contains small wiry perennial herbs up to 1.1 meters tall.

Sect. Takasagoya 
Takasagoya (Y.Kimura) N.Robson contains deciduous shrubs and shrublets that grow up to 1.5 m tall.

Sect. Triadenioides 
Triadenioides Jaub. & Spach contains 7 species. Its type species is H. pallens. H. haplophylloides has two subspecies: H. haplophylloides haplophylloides and H. haplophylloides devollense. The species of the section are found in the mountain ranges of Turkey and the Levant, and several are confined to the island of Socotra.

Triadenioides contains shrubs and shrublets that grow up to 60 centimeters tall. They grow prostrate to erect and the lower parts of the plant are deciduous. Those confined to Socotra lack dark glands, but the species in the Levant have red to black glands on the flower and sometimes leaves or stems. The leaves are either opposite or 3-whorled and are free and either sessile or petiolate. The species have between one and thirteen flowers that are stellate and have one style. They have 5 petals each which are spreading or erect. They have 3 stamen fascicles with many stamens and have 5 sepals.

Sect. Trigynobrathys 
Trigynobrathys (Y. Kimura) N.Robson contains shrubs and subshrubs as well as annual and perennial herbs that are very diverse in size and shape.

Sect. Tripentas
Tripentas (Casp.) N.Robson contains one long-stemmed perennial herb, H. elodes. Tripentas is sometimes separated into its own genus under the synonyms Elodes (Spach) W. Koch, Martia Sprengel, Perforaria Choisy, Spachelodes Y. Kimura, or Tripentas Casp.

Sect. Umbraculoides 
Umbraculoides N.Robson contains a single species, H. umbraculoides, for which the section is named. It is closely related to sect. Ascyreia.

Sect. Webbia 
Webbia (Spach) R. Keller contains a large deciduous shrub that can grow up to 4 meters tall.

Extinct 
Hypericum fossils have been found from the Late Eocene to the present day, with the most commonly found part of the plant being the seeds due to their hardiness. However, a small number of leaves and even pollen have also been found as fossils. The oldest fossil recovered was a seed belonging to the species H. antiquum which was found in Northern Asia. This species is considered to be the common ancestor of the family Hypericaceae.

See also 
 List of Hypericum nothospecies

References

External links

+List of Hypericum Species
Hypericum